Aldgate Pump is a historic water pump in London, located at the junction where Aldgate meets Fenchurch Street and Leadenhall Street.

The pump is notable for its long, and sometimes dark history, as well as its cultural significance as a symbolic start point of the East End of London. "East of Aldgate Pump" refers to the East End or to East London as a whole.

Design

Aldgate Pump is a Grade II listed structure. The metal wolf head on the pump's spout is supposed to signify the last wolf shot in the City of London.

Historic photographs show that the pump was formerly surmounted by an ornate lantern. The pump can no longer be used to draw water, but a drainage grating is still in place.

History

As a well, it was mentioned during the reign of King John in the early 1200s.

A structure is shown on Braun and Hogenburg's map of 1574, and shown as St Michael’s Well on the Agas map of 1633. John Stow recalled the execution of the Bailiff of Romford on a gibbet 'near the well within Aldgate'. This execution seems to have been carried out on the dubious basis that he was involved in Kett's Rebellion of 1549.

Served by one of London's many underground streams, the water was praised for being "bright, sparkling, and cool, and of an agreeable taste". These qualities were later found to be derived from decaying organic matter from adjoining graveyards, and the leaching of calcium from the bones of the dead in many new cemeteries in north London through which the stream ran from Hampstead. 
Several hundred people died during what became known as the Aldgate Pump Epidemic, and on its relocation in 1876, the New River Company changed the supplies to mains water.

Fenchurch Street railway station was built in 1841 upon the site of Aldgate Pump Court.

As the City of London developed, it is thought to have been taken down and moved a short distance to the west, to its current location in 1876, as a result of road widening.

East End

The line of the former eastern walls and gates of the City are taken as the usual start point of the East End, but the pump lies just inside the site of the former Aldgate.
The pump is a suitable symbolic start point for several reasons:
The removal of the gate and associated walls in the late 18th century gave the pump added significance. 
The social importance of pumps as meeting places
The pump marks the start of the originally Roman A11 road, later known as the Great Essex Road. Distances to locations in the Tower division of Middlesex, Essex and East Anglia were measured from here.

Cultural references

Phrases
East of Aldgate Pump is a term used to apply to the East End or East London as a whole. It is also used in two phrases which seem to hark back to the epidemic:
As Cockney Rhyming Slang; Aldgate Pump, or just Aldgate for short, rhymes with “get (or take) the hump”, i.e. to be annoyed.
A draft on Aldgate Pump refers to a harmful, worthless or fraudulent financial transaction, such as a bouncing cheque. The pun is on a draught (or draft) of water and a draft of money.
There's a pump up Aldgate, mate. Pump that! was an East End phrase directed at rent collectors believed to be pressing tenants unreasonably hard.

Music, TV and literature
Charles Dickens refers to the pump in The Uncommercial Traveller, published in 1860: "My day's no-business beckoning me to the East End of London. I had turned my face to that point of the metropolitan compass…and had got past Aldgate Pump."

Aldgate Pump was also the name of a song, written by G. W. Hunt for the lion comique Arthur Lloyd in 1869. In the song, the raconteur is abandoned by the girl "I met near Aldgate Pump".

Not without hyperbole, the pump was once referenced thus: "East of Aldgate Pump, people cared for nothing but drink, vice and crime".

References

Grade II listed buildings in the City of London
Tourist attractions in the City of London